Okoh Ebitu Ukiwe (born 26 October 1940) is a retired Commodore in the Nigerian Navy who served as the de facto Vice President of Nigeria under military head of state General Ibrahim Babangida from 1985 to 1986.

Family
Ukiwe was born on 26 October 1940, son of Chief Ebitu Ukiwe of Abiriba in Abia State. His father was a traditional ruler in Abiriba and Head of the Old Bende Division Local Government Appeal Court.

Naval career 
Ukiwe joined the Nigerian Navy in 1960 as a cadet (officer), and was commissioned in 1964 with the rank of sub-lieutenant. He defected to the Biafran Armed Forces in 1966.

Biafran War 
During the Nigerian Civil War from 1967 to 1970 he fought on the Biafran side. After the war, in January 1972 he was readmitted to the Navy, one of the few Igbo officers to regain their position.

Military career 
Ukiwe was a member of the Supreme Military Council between 1975 and 1977. General Olusegun Obasanjo appointed him military governor of Niger state in 1977. He was re-deployed to Lagos state as governor in July 1978, holding this post until October 1979.
He was also in the SMC under General Muhammadu Buhari from 1983 to 1985, while serving as Flag Officer, Western Naval command.
He was appointed director, Naval Faculty, Jaji (1981–1984) and Flag Officer, Western Naval Command (1984–1985).

Chief of General Staff 
In 1985, following the 1985 Nigerian military coup d'état military head of state General Ibrahim Babangida appointed Ukiwe as Chief of General Staff, and his second-in-command. In 1986, Commodore Ebitu Okoh Ukiwe, was removed as Chief of General Staff after opposing Babangida's decision to join the Organisation of Islamic Cooperation.

Later career

After retirement he joined the pro-democracy group, supporting Moshood Kashimawo Olawale Abiola, the president-elect in the June 1993 elections, who was imprisoned after General Sani Abacha took power in a coup in November 1993.

He became chairman of companies such as Bitu Properties, Kobimat, Bitu Promar and Rudocons. He was adviser and consultant to Statoil (Nigeria), an offshore oil production company, for nine years.

In 2001, Newswatch magazine speculated that he could run for president in 2003, characterizing him as principled personality. In 2006 Ukiwe unsuccessfully ran to become People's Democratic Party candidate for the presidency of Nigeria.

References

Vice presidents of Nigeria
1940 births
Living people
Peoples Democratic Party (Nigeria) politicians
Governors of Lagos State
Governors of Niger State
Nigerian Navy officers
Military personnel of the Nigerian Civil War
People from Abia State